The 2003 CEMAC Cup was the first edition of the CEMAC Cup, the football championship of Central African nations. It is the successor of the UDEAC Cup from 1984 to 1990. Originally the first edition was planned to take place in Bangui, Central African Republic in 2002, but it was canceled.  

The tournament was held in the Congo. All matches were played in Stade Alphonse Massemba-Débat, Brazzaville.

First round

Group A

Group B

Semi-finals

3rd Place Playoff

Final

References
Details at RSSSF archives

CEMAC Cup
CEMAC
CEMAC
CEMAC
International association football competitions hosted by the Republic of the Congo